The wildlife of Guinea is very diverse due to the wide variety of different habitats. The southern part of the country lies within Guinean Forests of West Africa Biodiversity Hotspot, while the north-east is characterized by dry savanna woodlands. Ecoregions of Guinea are Western Guinean lowland forest, Guinean montane forest, Guinean forest-savanna mosaic, West Sudanian Savanna, and Guinean mangroves.

Declining populations of large mammals are restricted to uninhabited distant parts of parks and reserves, because of the inappropriate nature conservation. A noteworthy NGO specialized to nature conservation is the Guinean Parks. Famous strongholds of Guinean wildlife are Pinselly Classified Forest, National Park of Upper Niger, Badiar National Park, Mount Nimba Strict Nature Reserve, Ziama Massif, Bossou Hills Reserve, and Diécké Classified Forest.

Fauna

Mammals

African buffalo
African forest buffalo
African forest elephant
Bushbuck
Guinea baboon
Giant forest hog
Hippopotamus
Pygmy hippopotamus
Red river hog
Royal antelope
West African lion
Western chimpanzee
Western Giant Eland
Western Bongo
Zebra duiker

Birds
List of birds of Guinea

Blue-headed wood-dove
Iris glossy-starling
White-necked rockfowl
White-breasted guineafowl

Reptiles
 Atractaspis aterrima
African puff adder
African rock python
Ball Python
Dwarf crocodile
Bitis rhinoceros
Nile monitor
Savannah monitor
Slender-snouted crocodile
West African crocodile
Western green mamba
 Hormonotus
 West African mud turtle
 White-headed dwarf gecko

Amphibians
 Arthroleptis bivittatus
 Arthroleptis crusculum
 Arthroleptis poecilonotus
 Astylosternus occidentalis
 Aubria subsigillata
 Conraua alleni
 Geotrypetes angeli
 Geotrypetes pseudoangeli
 Hylarana fonensis
 Hyperolius concolor
 Hyperolius fusciventris
 Hyperolius guttulatus
 Hyperolius igbettensis
 Hyperolius nitidulus
 Hyperolius occidentalis
 Hyperolius picturatus
 Hyperolius soror
 Hyperolius wermuthi
 Kassina cochranae
 Kassina fusca
 Kassina schioetzi
 Leptopelis macrotis
 Leptopelis spiritusnoctis
 Leptopelis viridis
 Merlin's dwarf gray frog
 Mount Nimba screeching frog
 Nigeria banana frog
 Nimbaphrynoides occidentalis
 Odontobatrachus
 Phlyctimantis boulengeri
 Phrynobatrachus guineensis
 Phrynobatrachus phyllophilus
 Ptychadena pujoli
 Ptychadena submascareniensis
 Ptychadena tournieri
 Ptychadena trinodis

Insects 

Insects of Guinea

Butterflies and moths

Flora
 Flora of Guinea

References of Flora and founa

External links

Biota of Guinea
Guinea
Nature conservation in Guinea